Lauren Weibert is an American deaf snowboarder. She competed at the 2015 Winter Deaflympics and took part in the women's snowboarding competition. She claimed a gold medal in the women's slopestyle event and a silver in the snowboard cross event. She also won the gold medal in the women's slopestyle event at the 2019 Winter Deaflympics.

She was also qualified to represent US at the 2011 Winter Deaflympics, but the event was eventually cancelled due to corruption allegations levelled on Slovak Deaf Sports chief which led to organizational failures.

References 

1988 births
Living people
American female snowboarders
Deaf sportspeople
American deaf people
Deaflympic gold medalists for the United States
Deaflympic silver medalists for the United States
Snowboarders at the 2015 Winter Deaflympics
Snowboarders at the 2019 Winter Deaflympics
Medalists at the 2015 Winter Deaflympics
Medalists at the 2019 Winter Deaflympics
21st-century American women